Aconibe (or Akonibe) is a town located on mainland Equatorial Guinea. Population 13,382 (2008 est.)  It is 4th largest settlement in the country.

References

Populated places in Wele-Nzas